Stanisław Antoni Szczuka h. Grabie  (1654 – May 19, 1710) was a Polish noble (szlachcic), talented politician and political writer.

Stanisław Antoni was son of a serviceman Stanisław Szczuka h. Grabie and Zofia Szpilewska de domo Neronowiczów. His father was taken hostage by Russians during the Russo-Polish War. Stanisław Antoni had two siblings: brother Gracjan Michał and sister Anna.

He married Konstancja Maria Anna Potocka h. Piława on February 6, 1695, the daughter of starost of Janów Bogusław Potocki h. Piława.

He was a Recorder of the Crown (referendarz koronny) in 1688, deputy of Polish–Lithuanian Commonwealth in Ducal Prussia in 1690, Deputy Chancellor of Lithuania from 1699.

Szczuka was born to a middle-class szlachta family and educated in Wilno and Kraków. Because of his own ability and hard work he achieved high offices in the Republic. He began his political career in 1675 as secretary of King Jan III Sobieski. In 1696 he became an adviser to August II.

In 1706 he changed sides and became a supporter of Stanisław Leszczyński.

He was a notable political writer and Sejm orator. He also proposed the opening of public schools free of charge.

As Sejm Marshal he led the extraordinary Sejm on November 17, 1688 – April 1, 1689 and the pacification Sejm on June 16–30, 1699 in Warsaw.

He died on May 19, 1710 in Warsaw and was buried in Szczuczyn.

Works
 Respons posła bez interesu na informację paszkwilową pseudo ministrów status (1688)
 Responsum illustrissimis et excellentissimis dominis comiti Weling et secretario status Hermelino, legatis Sueciae, gratulantibus pacem Saxonicam serenissimo Stanislao regi Poloniae, nomine eiusdem (1706)
 Contestatio gratiarum sacrae regiae majestati Sueciae, a senatorio et equestri ordine Poloniae, per... exhibita, in Saxonia in pago Alt-Ransteda, brak miejsca wydania (1706) 
 Eciipsis Poloniae Orbi Publice Demonstrata (1709)
 Powitanie od Izby poselskiej króla Jegomości... na sejmie roku 1699

Marriage and issue

Stanisław Antoni  married Konstancja Maria Anna Potocka h. Piława on 6 February 1695 and had five children:

 August Michal Szczuka
 Marcin Leopold Stefan Szczuka (1698–1728), starost of Wąwolnica, owner of and Biłgoraj and Wieksznie 
 Jan Konsty Szczuka (died 1726), owner of Biłgoraj, married Princess Salomeja Sapieha h. Lis
 Wiktoria Szczuka, married general and miecznik of the Crown Jan Stanisław Kątski h. Brochwicz, the son of voivode of Kijów (Kyiv, also Kiev) Marcin Kazimierz Kątski h. Brochwicz
 Maria Anna Szczuka

Bibliography
 Polski Słownik Biograficzny Vol. 47 p. 469
 Bibliografia Literatury Polskiej – Nowy Korbut, t. 3 Piśmiennictwo Staropolskie, Państwowy Instytut Wydawniczy, Warszawa 1965, s. 309-310

References

External links
 http://www.wilanow-palac.pl/antoni_stanislaw_szczuka_zaufany_sekretarz_jana_iii_sobieskiego.html
 http://www.bilp.uw.edu.pl/ti/1862/foto/nn16.htm
 http://www.bilgoraj.lbl.pl/hist/wlasciciele/stanislaw_szczuka.php

 Works by Stanisław Antoni Szczuka in digital library Polona

Secular senators of the Polish–Lithuanian Commonwealth
1650s births
1710 deaths
17th-century Polish nobility
Polish political writers
Deputy Chancellors of the Grand Duchy of Lithuania